The 2002 Coca-Cola Tigers season was the first season of the franchise in the Philippine Basketball Association (PBA).

Draft picks

New team
Formerly the Pop Cola Panthers, RFM Corporation sold its entire stake in softdrink unit Cosmos Bottling Corporation and its PBA franchise to Coca-Cola Bottlers Philippines, Inc. The team was renamed Coca-Cola Tigers as a new ballclub. Records of the Pop Cola Panthers were not retained.

Transactions

Occurrences
Key players Rudy Hatfield and Jeffrey Cariaso serve time for the national team in the first two conferences. Three other Tigers, rookie Rafi Reavis and center Poch Juinio played for RP-Selecta while Johnny Abarrientos played for RP-Hapee during the Governor's Cup.

Championship
The Coca Cola Tigers made history by becoming the first team to win a PBA title in its maiden season as they captured the season-ending All-Filipino Cup crown over the Alaska Aces, three games to one. The Tigers won their first championship on a historic night on Christmas Day with a 78-63 victory in Game four of the finals.

Roster

 Team Manager: Hector Calma

Elimination round

Games won

References

Powerade Tigers seasons
Coca